Lajas District is one of nineteen districts of the province Chota in Peru. The main provincial town is Lajas, home to an estimated 4,000 people. There is a significant population of Spanish ancestry. The town carnivals are celebrated in July.

See also 
 Kuntur Qaqa

References